The Kryts (self-designated хърыцӏаь) or Gryz are a people of Azerbaijan who reside in several villages in the Quba, Khachmaz, Ismayilli and Gabala regions, as well as in the cities of Baku and Sumgait. They are one of the peoples that have traditionally been called Shahdagh (along with the Budukh people and Khinalug people). 

In 2005, the number of Kryts was between 10,000 and 15,000. They speak the Kryts language, which belongs to the Lezgic branch of the Nakh-Dagestan language family. In addition, all speak the Azerbaijani language.

Demographics 
The number Kryts according to H. Seidlitz, extracted from family lists in 1886, was 7,767 people. In "The Sociolinguistic Situation of the Kryts in Azerbaijan" it was reported that the number of Kryts was between 10,000 and 15,000.

History 
The area the Kryts inhabit was once part of the Shirvan Khanate during the 18th century but then became part of the Kuba Khanate by the end of the century. The region was annexed into the Russian empire in 1806. During Soviet rule, the authorities imposed themselves into Kryt society, fully eliminating the autonomy the Kryt have historically enjoyed. Traditional beliefs and lifestyles valued by the Kryts underwent rapid change during this period as well.

Lifestyle and culture 
Their main occupation is raising livestock; agriculture and horticulture are of secondary importance. In the development of crafts, they manufacture of carpets, rugs and woollen patterned socks.

The Kryts are predominantly Sunni Muslims.

References 

Lezgins
Kryts

Ethnic groups in Azerbaijan
Peoples of the Caucasus
Muslim communities of the Caucasus